is a former Japanese football player.

Playing career
Suzuki was born in Shizuoka Prefecture on July 19, 1975. After graduating from Juntendo University, he joined J1 League club Cerezo Osaka in 1998. He played many matches as left side back from first season. In 2000s, he played many matches as center back and the club won the 2nd place 2001 Emperor's Cup. However the club results were bad in league competition in 2001 and was relegated to J2 League from 2002. The club returned to J1 in a year and eon the 2nd place 2003 Emperor's Cup. In 2004, he moved to J2 club Kyoto Purple Sanga. He played many matches as center back in 2004. Although his opportunity to play decreased in 2005, the club won the champions and was promoted to J1 from 2006. In 2006, he played as center back in full time in 5 matches from opening game. However he could not play for injury from the 6th match. Although he came back as substitute in October, he could not play at all in the match and retired end of 2006 season.

Club statistics

References

External links

jsgoal
kyotosangadc

1975 births
Living people
Juntendo University alumni
Association football people from Shizuoka Prefecture
Japanese footballers
J1 League players
J2 League players
Cerezo Osaka players
Kyoto Sanga FC players
Association football defenders